Live Oak Creek, a stream with its source in Reagan County, Texas at  at an elevation of 2938 feet, that runs southward  to its mouth at an elevation of 2001 feet on the Pecos River in Crockett County, Texas.

Live Oak Creek was a water source on the San Antonio-El Paso Road, 30.44 miles from Howard Springs and 3 miles from Fort Lancaster and 7.29 miles from Pecos Crossing.  Fort Lancaster was located to the east of this creek near its mouth.

On July 9, 1857, Edward Fitzgerald Beale described it:

Live Oak creek is a clear and beautiful stream of sweet and cool water; the grass very fine, and wood, (oak, mesquite, and willow,) abundant. Just before descending into the valley of the stream we came to a very steep, rocky hill, overlooking a valley of great beauty and graceful shape. The sides of the hills were covered with the most brilliant verdure and flowers,...

References

Pecos River
Bodies of water of Crockett County, Texas
Bodies of water of Reagan County, Texas